Gilbreth is a surname. Notable people with the surname include:

Bill Gilbreth (1947–2020), American baseball player
Ernestine Gilbreth Carey (1908–2006), American writer
Frank Bunker Gilbreth, Jr. (1911–2001), American writer
Frank Bunker Gilbreth, Sr. (1868–1924), American industrial engineer
Lillian Moller Gilbreth (1878–1972), American psychologist and industrial engineer
Robert Moller Gilbreth, American businessman, educator, and politician

See also
Gilbreth, Inc., early management consulting firm founded by Frank and Lillian Gilbreth
Gilbreath